Nemyriv Raion (transliteration from Ukrainian Nemyrivskyi Raion) was a raion (district) in Vinnytsia Oblast, Ukraine. The administrative center of Nemyriv Raion was the town of Nemyriv. The area of the raion was 1293 square km. There were 94 settlements in the raion. The raion was abolished and its territory was merged into Vinnytsia Raion on 18 July 2020 as part of the administrative reform of Ukraine, which reduced the number of raions of Vinnytsia Oblast to six. The last estimate of the raion population was

References

Notes

Sources

 Official Nemyriv Raion webpage
 Official page of the Nemyriv Raion state administration
 Official page of the Vinnytsia Oblast state administration

Former raions of Vinnytsia Oblast
1923 establishments in Ukraine
Ukrainian raions abolished during the 2020 administrative reform